The Mistralian norm is a linguistic norm for the Occitan language. It was first used in a published work by Joseph Roumanille in 1853, and then by Frédéric Mistral in 1854. Its aim is to make Provençal Occitan orthography more logical, relying on a mix of traditional spelling and French spelling conventions.

The Tresor dòu Felibrige, published by the Félibrige in 1878, was written entirely in the Mistralian norm.

Comparison 

Some features include:
For example,  becomes jouvenço in the text above.
 Using ou to represent , where Classical Occitan uses o. For example, Provença becomes Prouvènço in the text above.
 Using gn to represent , where Classical Occitan uses nh. For example, montanha becomes mountagno. 
 Using o to represent , where Classical Occitan uses ò. For example, pòrta becomes porto.

Encoding

References

External links 
 Lou Tresor dòu Felibrige, tomes I and II, via lexilogos.com.

Occitan language
1853 introductions
French inventions
Orthography reform
Indo-European Latin-script orthographies
Frédéric Mistral